Rébecca Beaumont (born 12 September 1990) is a Canadian professional racing cyclist, who last rode for the UCI Women's Team  during the 2019 women's road cycling season.

References

External links

1990 births
Living people
Canadian female cyclists
Place of birth missing (living people)